Irvin Bomb (born Irwin Baum; 1967 in New York City, New York) is an American painter, illustrator, and adult filmmaker.

Early life
In Irvin Bomb's early years he loved to draw dinosaurs and cartoons. While in his early 20s, his art shifted towards the rural and urban landscape. Bomb was commissioned in 1991 to paint a portrait of President Teddy Roosevelt which is on permanent public display in the United States Navy Memorial, located in Washington, DC. He later worked as an in-house illustrator at Marvel Entertainment and a freelance illustrator at Valiant Comics.

Education
In 1990 Bomb received his BFA from George Washington University.

Current
Bomb is the webmaster and creator of the erotic art adult website NaughtyArt.com,  which combines fine art painting and drawing with videos of art modeling and behind the scenes photo sets which illustrate the painting process. In addition artist tutorials are offered with respect to drawing and painting. Bomb's focus for the past 10 years has been painting the female form and he has documented many of his painting sessions on film. Larry Flynt released Bomb's first two DVDs, Nasty Art, under the LFP imprint. Bomb's DVD series, Naughty Art, focuses heavily on the painting process. His paintings and drawings have been published in BlackBook Magazine, Penthouse Magazine, High Society, and others.

Bomb's shows have aired on pay-per-view TV throughout North America. He was a featured guest on the Comedy Central show Insomniac with Dave Attell. He has an art book published of his paintings titled The Art of Irvin Bomb.

He currently works out of his studio in New York City.

References

External links
www.naughtyart.com/

1967 births
Living people
Fantasy artists
Pin-up artists
American erotic artists
American contemporary painters
20th-century American painters
American male painters
21st-century American painters
American illustrators
Painters from New York City
George Washington University alumni